The Manganuioteao River (official name since 22 August 1985, also known as Manganui o te Ao River and shown on older maps as Manganuiateau River) is a river of the centre of New Zealand's North Island.

The New Zealand Ministry for Culture and Heritage gives a translation of "great stream of the world" for Manganui-o-te-Ao. Other translations have been "Great river of light", or "Wide open valley with plenty of daylight".

See also
List of rivers of New Zealand
Tributary rivers
Makatote River
Mangaturturu River

References

Rivers of Manawatū-Whanganui
Rivers of New Zealand